Taylor Hawkins & The Coattail Riders is the debut album by the band Taylor Hawkins & The Coattail Riders. It was released in 2006 through Thrive Records. It features 11 songs which were recorded by the band during 2004, before Foo Fighters started recording In Your Honor.

The album art is a homage to James Gang Rides Again, the second album by James Gang, of whom Taylor Hawkins is a big fan (he also wrote a song about the band on the Coattail Riders' second album).

Track listing

References 

2006 debut albums
Taylor Hawkins and the Coattail Riders albums